In theoretical physics, more specifically in quantum field theory and supersymmetry, supersymmetric Yang–Mills, also known as super Yang–Mills and abbreviated to SYM, is a supersymmetric generalization of Yang–Mills theory, which is a gauge theory that plays an important part in the mathematical formulation of forces in particle physics.

Super Yang–Mills was studied by Julius Wess and Bruno Zumino in which they demonstrated the supergauge-invariance of the theory and wrote down its action, alongside the action of the Wess–Zumino model, another early supersymmetric field theory.

The treatment in this article largely follows that of Figueroa-O'Farrill's lectures on supersymmetry and of Tong.

While N = 4 supersymmetric Yang–Mills theory is also a supersymmetric Yang–Mills theory, it has very different properties to  supersymmetric Yang–Mills theory, which is the theory discussed in this article. The  supersymmetric Yang–Mills theory was studied by Seiberg and Witten in Seiberg–Witten theory. All three theories are based in  super Minkowski spaces.

The supersymmetric Yang–Mills action

Preliminary treatment 

A first treatment can be done without defining superspace, instead defining the theory in terms of familiar fields in non-supersymmetric quantum field theory.

Spacetime and matter content 
The base spacetime is flat spacetime (Minkowski space).

SYM is a gauge theory, and there is an associated gauge group  to the theory. The gauge group has associated Lie algebra .

The field content then consists of 
 a -valued gauge field 
 a -valued Majorana spinor field  (an adjoint-valued spinor), known as the 'gaugino'
 a -valued auxiliary scalar field .

For gauge-invariance, the gauge field  is necessarily massless. This means its superpartner  is also massless if supersymmetry is to hold.

Supersymmetric pure electromagnetic theory 

When , the conceptual difficulties simplify somewhat, and this is in some sense the simplest gauge theory. The field content is simply a (co-)vector field , a Majorana spinor  and a auxiliary real scalar field .

The Lagrangian written down by Wess and Zumino is then

This can be generalized to include a coupling constant , and theta term , where  is the dual field strength tensor

If we also replace the field  with the Weyl spinor , then a supersymmetric action can be written as

This can be viewed as a supersymmetric generalization of a pure  gauge theory, also known as Maxwell theory or pure electromagnetic theory.

Supersymmetric Yang–Mills theory (preliminary treatment) 
In full generality, we must define the gluon field strength tensor, 

and the covariant derivative of the adjoint Weyl spinor,

Supersymmetric Yang–Mills then readily generalizes from supersymmetric Maxwell theory. A simple version is

while a more general version is given by

Superspace treatment

Superspace and superfield content 

The base superspace is  super Minkowski space.

The theory is defined in terms of a single adjoint-valued real superfield , fixed to be in Wess–Zumino gauge.

Supersymmetric Maxwell theory on superspace 
The theory is defined in terms of a superfield arising from taking covariant derivatives of :
.
The supersymmetric action is then written down, with a complex coupling constant , as

where h.c. indicates the Hermitian conjugate of the preceding term.

Supersymmetric Yang–Mills on superspace 
For non-abelian gauge theory, instead define 

Then the action is

Symmetries of the action

Supersymmetry 

For the simplified Yang–Mills action on Minkowski space (not on superspace), the supersymmetry transformations are

where .

Then integrating over half of superspace, gives a supersymmetric action.

An important observation is that the Wess–Zumino gauge is not a supersymmetric gauge, that is, it is not preserved by supersymmetry. However, it is possible to do a compensating gauge transformation to return to Wess–Zumino gauge. Then, after a supersymmetry transformation and the compensating gauge transformation, the superfields transform as

Gauge symmetry 

The preliminary theory defined on spacetime is manifestly gauge invariant as it is built from terms studied in non-supersymmetric gauge theory which are gauge invariant.

The superfield formulation requires a theory of generalized gauge transformations. (Not supergauge transformations, which would be transformations in a theory with local supersymmetry).

Generalized abelian gauge transformations 

Such a transformation is parametrized by a chiral superfield , under which the real superfield transforms as

In particular, upon expanding  and  appropriately into constituent superfields, then  contains a vector superfield  while  contains a scalar superfield , such that

The chiral superfield used to define the action,

is gauge invariant.

Generalized non-abelian gauge transformations 

The chiral superfield is adjoint valued.
,
from which the transformation for  can be derived using the Baker–Campbell–Hausdorff formula.

The chiral superfield  is not invariant but transforms by conjugation: 
,
so that upon tracing in the action, the action is gauge-invariant.

Extra classical symmetries

Superconformal symmetry 

As a classical theory, supersymmetric Yang–Mills theory admits a larger set of symmetries, described at the algebra level by the superconformal algebra. Just as the super Poincaré algebra is a supersymmetric extension of the Poincaré algebra, the superconformal algebra is a supersymmetric extension of the conformal algebra which also contains a spinorial generator of conformal supersymmetry .

Conformal invariance is broken in the quantum theory by trace and conformal anomalies.

While the quantum  supersymmetric Yang–Mills theory does not have superconformal symmetry, quantum N = 4 supersymmetric Yang–Mills theory does.

R-symmetry 

The  R-symmetry for  supersymmetry is a symmetry of the classical theory, but not of the quantum theory due to an anomaly.

Adding matter

Abelian gauge 
Matter can be added in the form of Wess–Zumino model type superfields . Under a gauge transformation,
,
and instead of using just  as the Lagrangian as in the Wess–Zumino model, for gauge invariance it must be replaced with 

This gives a supersymmetric analogue to QED. The action can be written

For  flavours, we instead have  superfields , and the action can be written

with implicit summation.

However, for a well-defined quantum theory, a theory such as that defined above suffers a gauge anomaly. We are obliged to add a partner  to each chiral superfield  (distinct from the idea of superpartners, and from conjugate superfields), which has opposite charge. This gives the action

Non-Abelian gauge 
For non-abelian gauge, matter chiral superfields  are now valued in a representation  of the gauge group:
.

Then a simple SQCD action would be to take  to be the fundamental representation, and add the Wess–Zumino term:
.

More general and detailed forms of the super QCD action are given in that article.

Fayet–Iliopoulos term 

When the center of the Lie algebra  is non-trivial, there is an extra term which can be added to the action known as the Fayet–Iliopoulos term.

References 

Supersymmetric quantum field theory